Media manipulation is a series of related techniques in which partisans create an image or argument that favors their particular interests. Such tactics may include the use of logical fallacies, manipulation, outright deception (disinformation), rhetorical and propaganda techniques, and often involve the suppression of information or points of view by crowding them out, by inducing other people or groups of people to stop listening to certain arguments, or by simply diverting attention elsewhere. In Propaganda: The Formation of Men's Attitudes, Jacques Ellul writes that public opinion can only express itself through channels which are provided by the mass media of communication – without which there could be no propaganda.
It is used within public relations, propaganda, marketing, etc. While the objective for each context is quite different, the broad techniques are often similar.

As illustrated below, many of the more modern mass media manipulation methods are types of distraction, on the assumption that the public has a limited attention span.

Contexts

Activism 

Activism is the practice or doctrine that has an emphasis on direct vigorous action especially supporting or opposing one side of a controversial matter. It is quite simply starting a movement to affect or change social views. It is frequently started by influential individuals but is done collectively through social movements with large masses. These social movements can be done through public rallies, strikes, street marches and even rants on social media.

A large social movement that has changed public opinion through time would be the 'Civil Rights March on Washington', where Martin Luther King Jr. performed his 'I Have a Dream' speech attempting to change social views on Non-White Americans in the United States of America, 28 August 1963. Most of King's movements were done through non-violent rallies and public speeches to show the white American population that they were peaceful but also wanted change in their community. In 1964, the 'Civil Rights Acts' commenced giving Non-White Americans equality with all races.

Advertising 

Advertising is a form of promotion that seeks to persuade a certain audience to purchase a good or service. One of the first types of marketing, it aims to persuade its target market to either buy, sell, or carry out a particular action. This tends to be done by businesses who wish to sell their product by paying media outlets to show their products or services on television breaks, banners on websites and mobile applications. 

These advertisements are not only done by businesses but can also be done by certain groups. Non-commercial advertisers are those who spend money on advertising in a hope to raise awareness for a cause or promote specific ideas. These include groups such as interest groups, political parties, government organizations and religious movements. Most of these organizations intend to spread a message or sway public opinion instead of trying to sell products or services. Advertising can not only be found on social media, but it is also evident on billboards, newspapers, magazines and even word of mouth.

Hoaxing 

A hoax is something intended to deceive or defraud. Misleading public stunts, scientific frauds, false bomb threats and business scams are examples of hoaxes.

One hoax with political aims was a 2012 video, paid for by Greenpeace and made by The Yes Men, which received about 750,000 views in the month after its release. The video, purported to be footage filmed from a cell phone at a Shell party to celebrate the beginning of Arctic drilling operations, shows a drinking fountain that is designed to look like an oil platform malfunction and spray a dark beverage (similar to the appearance of oil) over a lady. This causes a commotion, with employees seen rushing to mop up the mess, and security guards attempting to confiscate the filmed footage. The hoax continued further through the distribution of fake legal messages from Shell that threatened legal action against the activists who supposedly pulled off the stunt, and even a fake website designed to look like Shell's, with copy such as "Birds are like sponges ... for oil!"

Propagandizing 

Propagandizing is a form of communication that is aimed at influencing the attitude of a community toward some cause or position by presenting only one side of an argument. Propaganda is commonly created by governments, but some forms of mass communication created by other powerful organizations can be considered propaganda as well. As opposed to impartially providing information, propaganda, in its most basic sense, presents information primarily to influence an audience. Propaganda is usually repeated and dispersed over a wide variety of media in order to create the chosen result in audience attitudes. While the term propaganda has justifiably acquired a strongly negative connotation by association with its most manipulative and jingoistic examples (e.g. Nazi propaganda used to justify the Holocaust), propaganda in its original sense was neutral, and could refer to uses that were generally benign or innocuous, such as public health recommendations, signs encouraging citizens to participate in a census or election, or messages encouraging persons to report crimes to the police, among others.

Propaganda uses societal norms and myths that people hear and believe. Because people respond to, understand and remember more simple ideas this is what is used to influence people's beliefs, attitudes and values.

Psychological warfare 

Psychological warfare is sometimes considered synonymous with propaganda. The principal distinction being that propaganda normally occurs within a nation, whereas psychological warfare normally takes place between nations, often during war or cold war. Various techniques are used to influence a target's values, beliefs, emotions, motives, reasoning, or behavior. Target audiences can be governments, organizations, groups, and individuals.

This tactic has been used in multiple wars throughout history. During World War II, the western Allies, expected for the Soviet Union would drop leaflets on the US and England. During the conflict with Iraq, American and English forces dropped leaflets, with many of the leaflets telling the people how to surrender. In the Korean War both sides would use loud speakers from the front lines. In 2009 people in Israel in the Gaza war received text messages on their cell phones threatening them with rocket attacks. The Palestinian people were getting phone calls and leaflets warning them that they were going to drop rockets on them. These phone calls and leaflets were not always accurate.

Public relations 

Public relations (PR) is the management of the flow of information between an individual or an organization and the public. Public relations may include an organization or individual gaining exposure to their audiences using topics of public interest and news items that do not require direct payment. PR is generally created by specialized individuals or firms at the behest of already public individuals or organizations, as a way of managing their public profile.

Techniques

Internet manipulation

Astroturfing 

Astroturfing is when there is an intent and attempt to create the illusion of support for a particular cause, person, or stance. While this is mainly connected to and seen on the internet, it has also happened in newspapers during times of political elections. Corporations and political parties try to imitate grassroots movements in order to sway the public to believing something that isn't true.

Clickbait 

Clickbait refers to headlines of online news articles that are sensationalized or sometimes completely fake. It uses people's natural curiosity to get people to click. In some cases clickbait is simply used to generate income, more clicks means more money made with advertisers. But these headlines and articles can also be used to influence a group of people on social media. They are constructed to appeal to the interest group's pre-existing biases and thus to be shared within filter bubbles.

Propaganda laundering 

Propaganda laundering is a method of using a less trusted or less popular platform to publish a story of dubious origin or veracity for the purposes of reporting on that report, rather than the story itself. This technique serves to insulate the secondary more established media from having to issue a retraction if the report is false. Generally secondary reports will report that the original report is reporting without verifying or making the report themselves.

Search engine marketing 

In search engine marketing websites use market research, from past searches and other sources, to increase their visibility in search engine results pages. This allows them to guide search results along the lines they desire, and thereby influence searchers.

Business have many tactics to lure customers into their websites and to generate revenue such as banner ads, search engine optimization and pay-per-click marketing tools. They all serve a different purpose and use different tools that appeal to multiple types of users. Banner ads appear on sites that then redirect to other sites that are similar. Search engine optimization is changing a page to seem more reliable or applicable than other similar pages. Pay-per-click involves certain words being highlighted because they were bought by advertisers to then redirect to a page containing information or selling whatever that word pertained to. By using the internet, users are susceptible to these type of advertisements without a clear advertising campaign being viewed.

Distraction

Distraction by major events 
Commonly known as "smoke screen", this technique consists of making the public focus its attention on a topic that is more convenient for the propagandist. This particular type of media manipulation has been referenced many times in popular culture. Some examples are:

The movie Wag the Dog (1997), which illustrates the public being deceitfully distracted from an important topic by presenting another that whose only quality is that of being more attractive.
In the U.S. TV series House of Cards, when protagonist Frank Underwood finds himself trapped in a media rampage, he addresses the viewer and says: "From the lion's den or a pack of wolves. When you're fresh meat, kill and throw them something fresher".
Politicians distract the public by showing them "shiny object" issues through the use of TV and other media. Sometimes they can be as simple as a politician with a reality show, like Sarah Palin had for a short time back in 2009, which aired on TLC.

Distracting the public 
This a mere variation of the traditional arguments known, in logic, as ad hominem and ad populum but applied to countries instead of individuals. This technique consists on refuting arguments by appealing to nationalism or by inspiring fear and hate towards a foreign country or to all the foreigners. It has the potential of being important since it gives the propagandists the power to discredit any information coming from other countries.

Some examples are:

Q: "What do you think about Khokara's politic on X matter?" A: "I think they've been wrong about everything for the last 20 years or so..."

Q: "Your idea is quite similar to the one proposed in Falala." A: "Are you suggesting Falala is a better country than ours?"

Straw man fallacy 

An informal fallacy. The "straw man" consists of appearing to refute the opponent's argument while actually attacking another topic. For it to work properly the topic that was actually refuted and the one that should have been refuted need to be similar.

Distraction by scapegoat 

This is a combination of the straw man fallacy and the ad hominem argument. It is often used to incriminate someone in order to  argument the innocence of someone else.

Audio manipulation

Photo manipulation 

Visual media can be transformed through photo manipulation, commonly called "photoshopping." This can make a product, person, or idea seem more appealing. This is done by highlighting certain features on the product and using certain editing tools to enlarge the photo, to attract and persuade the public.

Video manipulation

Video manipulation is a new variant of media manipulation that targets digital video using a combination of traditional video processing and video editing techniques and auxiliary methods from artificial intelligence like face recognition. In typical video manipulation, the facial structure, body movements, and voice of the subject are replicated in order to create a fabricated recording of the subject. The applications of these methods range from educational videos to videos aimed at (mass) manipulation and propaganda, a straightforward extension of the long-standing possibilities of photo manipulation. This form of computer-generated misinformation has contributed to fake news, and there have been instances when this technology was used during political campaigns.

Compliance professionals 
A compliance professional is an expert that utilizes and perfects means of gaining media influence.  Though the means of gaining influence are common, their aims vary from political, economic, to personal.  Thus the label of compliance professional applies to diverse groups of people, including propagandists, marketers, pollsters, salespeople and political advocates.

Techniques 
Means of influence include, but are not limited to, the methods outlined in Influence: Science and Practice:

 Authority
 Commitment and consistency
 Reciprocation
 Scarcity
 Social proof

Additionally, techniques like framing and less formal means of effective obfuscation, such as the use of logical fallacies, are used to gain compliance.

See also 

Related topics

 Agnotology
 Concentration of media ownership
 Consumer confusion
 Consumer psychology
 Consumer science
 Crowd manipulation
 Deception
 Disinformation
 Demagogy
 Front organization
 Gatekeeping (communication)
 Gotcha journalism
 Guerrilla marketing
 Outline of public relations
 Ideocracy
 Ideology
 Indoctrination
 Internet manipulation
 McCarthyism
 Media regulation
 Media transparency
 Meme
 News management
 Promotion (marketing)
 Sensationalism
 Spin (public relations)
 The True Believer
 Under color of authority
 Viral marketing

Notable compliance experts

Edward Bernays
Ryan Holiday
Ivy Lee
Frank Luntz

Notable media manipulation theorists

 Noam Chomsky
 Edward S. Herman
 Michael Moore
 Michael Parenti

References

Further reading 

Overviews
Chomsky, Noam; Herman, Edward S., Manufacturing Consent: The Political Economy of the Mass Media, New York: Pantheon Books, 1988.
Cialdini, Robert B., Influence: Science and Practice, 4th Edition New Jersey: Allyn & Bacon, 2000.
Ewen, Stuart, Captains of Consciousness: Advertising and the Social Roots of the Consumer Culture, New York: McGraw-Hill, 1976.
Ewen, Stuart, PR! A Social History of Spin, New York: Basic Books, 1996.
Ewen, Stuart; Ewen, Elizabeth, Channels of Desire: Mass Images and the Shaping of American Consciousness, New York: McGraw-Hill, 1982.
 Ellul, Jacques. Propaganda: The Formation of Men's Attitudes. Trans. Konrad Kellen & Jean Lerner. New York: Knopf, 1965. New York: Random House/ Vintage 1973
Jamieson,  H.  K, Dirty  Politics:  Deception,  Distraction  and  Democracy  Oxford University  Press, 1992.
Jowett, Garth S.; O'Donnell, Victoria, Propaganda and Persuasion, Thousand Oaks, CA: SAGE Publications, 1999. .
Parenti,  M.,  Monopoly  Media  Manipulation,  Mediterranean  Quarterly, Spring  2002.
Lutz, William D., Doublespeak, New York, NY: HarperPerennial, 1990. .
Rushkoff, Douglas, "They Say", in Coercion: Why We Listen to What "They" Say, New York: Riverhead Books, 1999.
Case studies
Beeston,  R.,  Bin  Laden  Heads  List  of  Suspects,  Terror  in America  Times, 12 September 2001.
Bohannon, J., I  Fooled  Millions  of  People  into  Thinking  Chocolate Helps  Weight  Loss,  Here's  How  IO9,  Gizmodo,  Debunkery, 27  May  2015.
Braddock  J.,  Historian  says  US  backed  "efficious  terror"  in  1965 Indonesian  Massacre,  World  Socialist  Website, 7  July  2009.
Cashmore, E.;  McLaughlin, E.,  Out  of  Order:  Policing  Black  People,  Routledge, 1991.
Hodges,  D., West  Africans  Are  Streaming  Across  the  U.S.  Southern  Border  Carrying  the  Ebola  Virus,  The  Common  Sense  Show, 3 August 2014.
Howard, Philip N.; Ganesh, Bharath; Liotsiou, Dimitra; Kelly, John; François, Camille, The IRA, Social Media and Political Polarization in the United States, 2012-2018. Computational Propaganda Research Project, 17 December 2018.
Kellner,  D.,  9/11,  Spectacles  of  terror,  and  media  manipulation, Miscellany, 15 August 2006.
Ostrow, J., Politics  in  Russia:  A  Reader,  Sage  Publications, 26  June  2012.
Sniffen, Michael J., Libby case witness details art of media manipulation, Boston Globe, 28 January 2007.
Turner-Sadler, J.,  African  American  History:  An  Introduction,  Peter  Lang Publishing, 2009.

External links
"The Persuaders" Frontline
"Understanding Jargon: A Short Bibliography" by Philip E. Agre

 
Consumer behaviour
Social influence
Manipulation
Articles containing video clips